The Worshipful Company of Fletchers is one of the Livery Companies of the City of London.

Originally, bowyers (longbow-makers) and fletchers (arrow-makers) comprised one organisation. However, in 1371, the fletchers petitioned the Lord Mayor to divide into their own Company, leaving the bowyers to form the Worshipful Company of Bowyers.

The trade of fletchers, considering the development of more technologically advanced weapons, has disappeared entirely. The Company still remains, however, primarily as a charitable institution, as do a majority of the 110 Livery Companies.
	
The Fletchers' Company ranks 39th in the order of precedence of the Livery Companies, immediately below the bowyers. Its motto is True and Sure.

External links
 The Fletchers' Company official website

Fletchers
1371 establishments in England